South Point is a census-designated place in Cameron County, Texas, United States. The population was 1,376 at the 2010 census, up from 1,118 at the 2000 census. Part of the Brownsville–Harlingen Metropolitan Statistical Area, South Point is the southernmost census designated place in the state of Texas.

Geography
South Point is located in southern Cameron County at  (25.870009, -97.383255).

Demographics

2020 census

As of the 2020 United States census, there were 1,014 people, 252 households, and 252 families residing in South Point.

2000 census
As of the census of 2000, there were 1,118 people, 257 households, and 242 families residing in South Point. The population density was 870.1 people per square mile (337.2/km2). There were 291 housing units at an average density of 226.5/sq mi (87.8/km2). The racial makeup of South Point was 96.69% White, 0.09% African American, 3.13% from other races, and 0.09% from two or more races. Hispanic or Latino of any race were 99.28% of the population.

There were 257 households, out of which 60.7% had children under the age of 18 living with them, 77.0% were married couples living together, 12.5% had a female householder with no husband present, and 5.8% were non-families. 4.7% of all households were made up of individuals, and 0.4% had someone living alone who was 65 years of age or older. The average household size was 4.35 and the average family size was 4.50.

In South Point, the population was spread out, with 38.6% under the age of 18, 12.3% from 18 to 24, 28.1% from 25 to 44, 16.6% from 45 to 64, and 4.4% who were 65 years of age or older. The median age was 24 years. For every 100 females, there were 96.5 males. For every 100 females age 18 and over, there were 93.2 males.

The median income for a household in South Point was $21,688, and the median income for a family was $22,438. Males had a median income of $20,000 versus $11,375 for females. The per capita income for the CDP was $5,989. About 35.5% of families and 40.2% of the population were below the poverty line, including 51.6% of those under age 18 and 35.7% of those age 65 or over.

Education
South Point is served by the Brownsville Independent School District.

In addition, South Texas Independent School District operates magnet schools that serve the community.

References

Census-designated places in Cameron County, Texas
Census-designated places in Texas